Hackney was a two-seat constituency in the House of Commons of the UK Parliament created under the Representation of the People Act, 1867 (often termed Second Reform Act) from the former northern parishes of the Tower Hamlets constituency and abolished under the Redistribution of Seats Act, 1885 (often termed a twin Third Reform Act, with its enabling Reform Act 1884).

The constituency existed in its two-seat form for three general elections and returned two Liberal Party Members at each election until its abolition. At abolition it was noted intense house- and apartment (tenement block-) building had occurred within its boundaries and it was divided into seven single seats.

Boundaries

The vestry of the civil parish of Hackney became a local government authority in 1855.

The parliamentary borough of Hackney was established in 1868 and its area formed part of the east of the historic county of Middlesex. It comprised:

The area thus formed the northern rump of Shoreditch and rest of the north of the former parliamentary borough of Tower Hamlets (Hackney accounted for the northernmost of the Hamlets in the nineteenth century, see Tower Division). The area was to the east of Islington and Hornsey, south of Tottenham in its county and west of Walthamstow in Essex.

In 1885 the two-member constituency was abolished. In 1889 the former area, for administrative purposes, became part of the London County Council local authority. In 1900 the main civil vestry was dissolved and the Metropolitan Borough of Hackney was created (with the same boundaries as the Parliamentary Borough). Since 1965 it has been part of Greater London.

Members of Parliament

Elections
Turnout, in multi-member elections, is estimated by dividing the number of votes by two. To the extent that electors did not use both their votes, the figure given will be an underestimate.

Change is calculated for individual candidates, when a party had more than one candidate in an election or the previous one. When a party had only one candidate in an election and the previous one change is calculated for the party vote.

Elections in the 1860s

Elections in the 1870s

 

 Election declared void on petition

Elections in the 1880s

 

The appointment of Fawcett as Postmaster General and Holms as a Lord Commissioner of the Treasury caused a by-election for both seats.

The death of Fawcett caused a by-election.

References

Sources 
 Boundaries of Parliamentary Constituencies 1885-1972, compiled and edited by F.W.S. Craig (Parliamentary Reference Publications 1972)
 British Parliamentary Election Results 1832-1885, compiled and edited by F.W.S. Craig (Macmillan Press 1977)
 Social Geography of British Elections 1885-1910. by Henry Pelling (Macmillan 1967)
 Who's Who of British Members of Parliament: Volume I 1832-1885, edited by M. Stenton (The Harvester Press 1976)
 Who's Who of British Members of Parliament, Volume II 1886-1918, edited by M. Stenton and S. Lees (Harvester Press 1978)

Parliamentary constituencies in London (historic)
Parliamentary constituencies in the London Borough of Hackney
Constituencies of the Parliament of the United Kingdom established in 1868
Constituencies of the Parliament of the United Kingdom disestablished in 1885